Afropectinariella is a genus of flowering plants belonging to the family Orchidaceae.

Its native range is Western and Western Central Tropical Africa.

Species:

Afropectinariella doratophylla 
Afropectinariella gabonensis 
Afropectinariella pungens 
Afropectinariella subulata

References

Orchids
Orchid genera